Aspen Kohl Ladd (born March 1, 1995) is an American professional mixed martial artist who is competing in the Featherweight division of Professional Fighters League (PFL). A professional since 2015, Ladd started her professional mixed martial arts career in Invicta FC before competing in the Ultimate Fighting Championship (UFC) in the Bantamweight division.

Background
Ladd was born and grew up in Pioneer, California with two younger brothers and three younger sisters. The younger of her brothers, Shaylor, is also a mixed martial artist. After being homeschooled until then, Ladd briefly attended Folsom Lake College, but then terminated her studies to fully focus on her mixed martial arts career. Having previously danced ballet and run long-distance, she started training martial arts around the age of 14 and made her amateur debut right after turning 18.

Mixed martial arts career

Invicta FC
Following an amateur run of 8–1, which included 6 finishes, Ladd signed with Invicta FC in late 2014.

Ladd was scheduled to make her professional debut against Kristi Lopez on February 27, 2015, at Invicta FC 11. However, Lopez suffered an injury in training and was replaced by decorated grappler Ana Carolina Vidal. Ladd won the fight via TKO in the first round.

Ladd next faced Amanda Cooper on September 12, 2015, at Invicta FC 14. She submitted Cooper with an armbar towards the end of the second round.

Ladd made her Bantamweight debut in a bout against Kelly McGill on March 11, 2016, at Invicta FC 16. She won the fight via TKO in third round.

Ladd faced Jessica Hoy on July 29, 2016, at Invicta FC 18. During the weigh ins, Ladd missed weight, coming in 2.1 lbs over the bantamweight limit. She elected not to cut any additional weight and was fined 25 percent of her purse, which went to her opponent. The bout proceeded at a catchweight of 138.1 lbs. She won the fight via TKO in the second round.

Ladd would make her final appearance for the promotion when she faced Sijara Eubanks on January 14, 2017, at Invcita FC 21. She won the fight via unanimous decision, marking the first time Ladd had failed to finish her opponent in her professional career.

Ultimate Fighting Championship
Ladd was scheduled to make her UFC debut against Jessica Eye on July 7, 2017, at The Ultimate Fighter 25 Finale. However, the day of the event Ladd fell ill and the bout was canceled.

Ladd eventually made her UFC debut against Lina Länsberg on October 22, 2017, at UFC Fight Night 118. She won the bout via TKO in the second round

Ladd was scheduled to face Leslie Smith on April 21, 2018, at UFC Fight Night 128. At the weigh-ins, Ladd weighed in at 137.8 lbs, 1.8 lbs over the bantamweight non-title fight upper limit of 136 lbs. Ladd offered Leslie an additional $5,000 on top of her 20% purse deduction. However, the fight was removed from the card after Smith refused to fight at catchweight.

Ladd next faced former Invicta FC Bantamweight Champion Tonya Evinger on October 6, 2018, at UFC 229. She won the fight via TKO in the first round. This win earned her the Performance of the Night award.

Ladd was scheduled to face Holly Holm on March 2, 2019, at UFC 235. However, on January 31, 2019, it was reported the fight would no longer take place at the event.

A rematch with Sijara Eubanks took place on May 18, 2019, at UFC Fight Night 152. She won the fight via unanimous decision. This fight earned her the Fight of the Night award.

Ladd faced Germaine de Randamie on July 13, 2019, at UFC Fight Night 155. At the weigh-ins for the event on July 12, Ladd attracted media attention for having a noticeably difficult weight cut which included her trembling on the scale and wincing in pain while weighing in and was described by a journalist covering the event as "[looking] like she was on the verge of a serious medical mishap." However, Ladd was cleared by the California State Athletic Commission to fight and hours later at the ceremonial weigh-ins she dismissed the seriousness of the situation by saying "I feel fantastic, now. I mean it’s always a little bit rough, that was particularly rough but I made it, I’m feeling good, and I’m ready for tomorrow." She lost the fight via technical knockout 16 seconds into round one, setting a women's bantamweight record and suffering her first professional loss. Despite initially accepting the loss in a post-fight interview, Ladd appealed it in October on the grounds of premature stoppage. However, the athletic commission voted 3–2 against the appeal, leaving the TKO loss intact.

Ladd's bantamweight license was suspended by California State Athletic Commission after gaining 18 percent of her weight between weigh-ins and fight day against Germaine de Randamie at UFC on ESPN+ 13. "Extensive medical documentation" is needed to clear suspension.

Ladd faced Yana Kunitskaya on December 7, 2019, at UFC on ESPN 7. She won the fight via technical knockout in round three.

Ladd was set to face Julianna Peña on March 28, 2020, at UFC on ESPN 8. However, Peña pulled out of the fight in early March citing an injury. In turn, promotion officials elected to remove Ladd from the card entirely, and the pairing was expected to be rescheduled at a future event. Instead Ladd was scheduled to face Sara McMann on June 27, 2020, at UFC on ESPN: Poirier vs. Hooker. However, Ladd suffered a training injury, tearing both her ACL and MCL and was forced to withdraw from the event.

Ladd was scheduled to face Macy Chiasson on July 24, 2021, at UFC on ESPN: Sandhagen vs. Dillashaw. However, the bout was scrapped due to Chiasson suffering an injury. The bout was rescheduled to UFC Fight Night 193 on October 2, 2021. At the weigh-ins, Ladd weighed in at 137 pounds, one pound over the bantamweight non-title limit; due to health concerns resulting from her weight cut, the bout against Chiasson was cancelled.

Ladd faced Norma Dumont, replacing injured Holly Holm, in a featherweight bout on October 16, 2021, at UFC Fight Night 195. She lost the fight via unanimous decision.

Ladd was scheduled to face Irene Aldana on April 9, 2022, at UFC 273. However, Aldana withdrew in late March for unknown reasons and was replaced by former UFC Women's Bantamweight Championship challenger Raquel Pennington. She lost the bout via unanimous decision.

Ladd was scheduled to face Sara McMann on August 13, 2022, at UFC on ESPN 41. However, Ladd was tested positive for COVID-19 and she was forced to withdraw from the event, and they were rescheduled for UFC Fight Night 210 on September 17.  At the weigh-ins, Ladd weighed in at 138 pounds, two pounds over the bantamweight non-title  fight limit. As a result the bout was scrapped.

After missing weight for the third time in her UFC career leading to a fight cancellation, Ladd was released from the UFC.

Professional Fighters League 
After her UFC release, it was announced on October 4, 2022, that Ladd had signed with the Professional Fighters League and would compete in the featherweight division the next year.

Ladd faced Julia Budd on November 25, 2022, at PFL 10. She won her promotional debut via split decision.

2023 Season 
Ladd will start off the 2023 PFL season against Olena Kolesnyk on April 7, 2023 at PFL 2.

Personal life
Ladd is in a relationship with her MMA coach Jim West.

Championships and accomplishments
Ultimate Fighting Championship
Performance of the Night (One time) 
Fight of the Night (One time)

Mixed martial arts record

|-
|Win
|align=center|10–3
|Julia Budd
|Decision (split)
|PFL 10
|
|align=center|3
|align=center|5:00
|New York City, New York, United States
|
|-
|Loss
|align=center|9–3
|Raquel Pennington
|Decision (unanimous)
|UFC 273
|
|align=center|3
|align=center|5:00
|Jacksonville, Florida, United States
|
|-
|Loss
|align=center|9–2
|Norma Dumont
|Decision (unanimous)
|UFC Fight Night: Ladd vs. Dumont
|
|align=center|5
|align=center|5:00
|Las Vegas, Nevada, United States
|
|-
|Win
|align=center|9–1
|Yana Kunitskaya
|TKO (punches)
|UFC on ESPN: Overeem vs. Rozenstruik 
|
|align=center|3
|align=center|0:33
|Washington, D.C., United States
|   
|-
|Loss
|align=center|8–1
|Germaine de Randamie
|TKO (punch)
|UFC Fight Night: de Randamie vs. Ladd 
|
|align=center|1
|align=center|0:16
|Sacramento, California, United States
|
|-
|Win
|align=center|8–0
|Sijara Eubanks
|Decision (unanimous)
|UFC Fight Night: dos Anjos vs. Lee 
|
|align=center|3
|align=center|5:00
|Rochester, New York, United States
|
|-
|Win
|align=center|7–0
|Tonya Evinger
|TKO (punches)
|UFC 229 
|
|align=center|1
|align=center|3:26
|Las Vegas, Nevada, United States
|
|-
|Win
|align=center|6–0
|Lina Länsberg
|TKO (punches)
|UFC Fight Night: Cowboy vs. Till
|
|align=center|2
|align=center|2:33
|Gdańsk, Poland
|
|-
| Win
| align=center| 5–0
| Sijara Eubanks
| Decision (unanimous)
| Invicta FC 21: Anderson vs. Tweet
| 
| align=center|3
| align=center|5:00
| Kansas City, Missouri, United States
|
|-
| Win
| align=center| 4–0
| Jessica Hoy
| TKO (elbows and punches)
| Invicta FC 18: Grasso vs. Esquibel
| 
| align=center|2 
| align=center|3:14
| Kansas City, Missouri, United States
|
|-
| Win
| align=center| 3–0
| Kelly McGill
| TKO (elbows and punches)
| Invicta FC 16: Hamasaki vs. Brown
| 
| align=center| 3
| align=center| 1:47
| Las Vegas, Nevada, United States
| 
|-
| Win
| align=center| 2–0
| Amanda Cooper
| Submission (armbar)
| Invicta FC 14: Evinger vs. Kianzad
| 
| align=center| 2
| align=center| 4:42
| Kansas City, Missouri, United States
| 
|-
| Win
| align=center| 1–0
| Ana Carolina Vidal
| TKO (punches and elbows)
| Invicta FC 11: Cyborg vs. Tweet
| 
| align=center| 1
| align=center| 4:21
| Los Angeles, California, United States
|
|-

Amateur mixed martial arts record

|-
| Win
|align=center| 8–1
| Roma Pawelek
| Technical submission (guillotine choke)
| Tuff-N-Uff - The Future Stars of MMA
| 
|align=center| 1
|align=center| 2:45
|Las Vegas, Nevada, United States
| 
|-
| Loss
|align=center| 7–1
| Cynthia Calvillo
| Decision (unanimous)
| West Coast FC 9
| 
|align=center| 3
|align=center| 5:00
| McClellan, California, United States
| 
|-
| Win
|align=center| 7–0
| Madeline Simmons Kidder
| TKO (punches)
| West Coast FC 8
| 
|align=center| 1
|align=center| 2:02
| Sacramento, California, United States
| 
|-
| Win
|align=center| 6–0
| Silvia Babaeghian
| Decision (unanimous)
| Ultimate Reno Combat 44
| 
|align=center| 3
|align=center| 5:00
| Reno, Nevada, United States
|
|-
| Win
|align=center| 5–0
| Leslie Rodriguez
| Decision (unanimous)
| West Coast FC 6
| 
|align=center| 3
|align=center| 5:00
| Placerville, California, United States
|
|-
| Win
|align=center| 4–0
| Veronica Carousos
| Submission (armbar)
| Ultimate Reno Combat 42
| 
|align=center| 1
|align=center| 0:25
| Reno, Nevada, United States
| 
|-
| Win
|align=center| 3–0
| Karla Gonzalez-Santoyo
| TKO (strikes)
| Ultimate Reno Combat 41
| 
|align=center| 1
|align=center| 2:08
| Reno, Nevada, United States
|
|-
| Win
|align=center| 2–0
| Michelle Mix
| Submission (armbar)
| Ultimate Reno Combat 40
| 
|align=center| 1
|align=center| 1:08
| Reno, Nevada, United States
|
|-
| Win
|align=center| 1–0
| Jaimelene Nievera
| Submission (Americana)
| Montbleu Resort & WFC - MMA at the Lake
| 
|align=center| 2
|align=center| 2:14
| Lake Tahoe, Nevada, United States
|
|-

References

External links
 
 

1995 births
Mixed martial artists from California
People from Folsom, California
American female mixed martial artists
Living people
Bantamweight mixed martial artists
Flyweight mixed martial artists
Mixed martial artists utilizing boxing
Mixed martial artists utilizing kickboxing
Mixed martial artists utilizing wrestling
Mixed martial artists utilizing Brazilian jiu-jitsu
American practitioners of Brazilian jiu-jitsu
Female Brazilian jiu-jitsu practitioners
Ultimate Fighting Championship female fighters
21st-century American women